Varsity View Magazine is a monthly publication for the Omaha, Nebraska metro area of the United States. It was founded in 2002 delivers High School news.  In every issue of the Varsity View there are profiles of students that excel in combined sports and academics. Varsity View has articles on health and fitness and articles on how to finance college education. The publication includes puzzles, games and advice columns as well as all the latest men's and women's sport schedules from the freshman to the varsity. Varsity View  is distributed at all of the area high schools as well as 186 different Omaha Metro businesses.

See also
 Media in Omaha, Nebraska

References

Monthly magazines published in the United States
Magazines established in 2002
Magazines published in Nebraska
Mass media in Omaha, Nebraska
News magazines published in the United States
Student magazines published in the United States